Pip Day (born 1969 in the United Kingdom) is a curator and writer. She was the Director/Curator of the SBC Gallery of Contemporary Art in Montreal from 2012-2019. She is also a contributing editor to Cabinet Magazine and has written independently for catalogues and journals including Art Review, Curare and Photography Quarterly. Day made a contribution to the catalogue From Conceptualism to Feminism: Lucy Lippard’s Numbers Shows 1969–74 where she wrote on artists' initiatives in Argentina and their influence on Lippard's developing political consciousness.

She was announced as part of the Curatorial Team for 2016 SITELines a group of five international guest curators invited to present a biennial exhibition series that reimagines New Perspectives on Art of the Americas for the SITE Santa Fe Contemporary Art Center. The team includes curators Rocío Aranda-Alvarado, Kathleen Ash-Milby, Pablo León de la Barra and Kiki Mazzucchelli. As part of her current exhibition projects at SBC Gallery she has developed two year curatorial projects based on thematics of Sovereignty and the docu-fictional  narrative of Jewish Brazilian writer Clarice Lispector's novel Aqua Viva.

She also established the research collective El Instituto which is currently headquarters in Mexico City. Since 2011 El Instituto has been operating as a non-for-profit organization exploring the invisible nature of politics concerning, "the overlap between art, culture, activism and human rights theory and practice, both locally and internationally." The project which features exhibitions, workshops, conferences and other various events is sponsored by the US Embassy, The Andy Warhol Foundation for the Visual Arts and the Patronato de Arte Contemporaneo a.c.

Day was additionally, a part of the LUMA Foundation symposium, "How Institutions Think" in 2016, convened to confront best practices for museums and art galleries by sharing knowledge, institutional formats and new models for exhibition. Notable contributors included: David Beech, Luc Boltanski, Clémentine Deliss and Hans Ulrich Obrist.

Education
Day obtained a master's degree in Curatorial Studies at the Center for Curatorial Studies, Bard College and a BA in Art History from the University of Toronto

References

1969 births
Living people
British women curators
British curators
British non-fiction writers
British women writers